Government Secondary School, Beedsar is a school located in the Bidsar village, of Sikar district of Indian, state Rajasthan. It is offering school study in Hindi medium from LKG level to the 10th level. The students appear in the Secondary Certificate examinations conducted by the Rajasthan Board.

History
The school, Initially it was offering study till 8th standard. But subsequently it got secondary school status from the Board of Secondary Education, Rajasthan (BSER) and subsequently, it was started offering study  till 10th standard. As per Indian school education system, there are class naming from Ist standard to 10th standard.

Location
School is located near Beedsar to Nawalgarh Road . It takes 10–15 minutes to reach the school from Nawalgarh Bus stand.

School timing and working days
 Summer: 07:30 am 12:00 pm.
 Winter: 10:30 am 4:30 pm.
 Working days: Monday to Saturday.

References

External links and references
Board of Secondary Education Rajasthan
Satellite view of Beedsar School
Google Satellite view of Beedsar School

High schools and secondary schools in Rajasthan
Education in Sikar district
1955 establishments in Rajasthan
Educational institutions established in 1955